Voljevci is a village in Serbia. It is situated in the Mali Zvornik municipality, in the Mačva District of Central Serbia. The village has a Serb ethnic majority and its population in 2002 was 719, of whom 702 were Serbs.

Historical population
1948: 677
1953: 739
1961: 763
1971: 730
1981: 847
1991: 780
2002: 719

See also
List of places in Serbia

References

Populated places in Mačva District